Mike Mabry (born April 26, 1980) is a former American football center. He was drafted by the Baltimore Ravens in the seventh round of the 2003 NFL Draft. He played college football at UCF.

Mabry was also a member of the Cincinnati Bengals, Atlanta Falcons, Cologne Centurions, Philadelphia Soul, Cleveland Browns and Sacramento Mountain Lions.

Early years
Mabry attended Dayton High School in Dayton, Texas and was a student and a standout in football, basketball, track, and powerlifting.

1980 births
Living people
Players of American football from Houston
American football centers
American football defensive linemen
UCF Knights football players
Baltimore Ravens players
Cincinnati Bengals players
Cologne Centurions (NFL Europe) players
Atlanta Falcons players
Philadelphia Soul players
Cleveland Browns players
Sacramento Mountain Lions players